Tour EP is an EP released by Canadian extreme metal band Strapping Young Lad. The EP was sold at live shows as a promo for their then-upcoming self-titled album, Strapping Young Lad. The EP includes alternate mixes of two tracks from Strapping Young Lad, two live tracks and "Oh My Fucking God". Only 2500 copies of Tour EP were pressed.

Track listing

Personnel
Devin Townsend – vocals, guitar, production
Jed Simon – guitar
Gene Hoglan – drums, percussion
Byron Stroud – bass guitar

2003 EPs
Strapping Young Lad albums
Century Media Records albums
Albums produced by Devin Townsend